Bhangchari is a village in the Muktsar district of Punjab, India. 

Villages in Sri Muktsar Sahib district